Ronnie Bond (born Ronald James Bullis; 4 May 1940 – 13 November 1992) was an English drummer, best known as the original drummer with the 1960s rock band The Troggs.

The Troggs 
Born in Andover, Hampshire, Bond was the original drummer with The Troggs, whose hits included "Wild Thing", (UK no. 2; US no. 1); "With a Girl Like You", (UK no. 1; US no. 29) and "I Can't Control Myself", (UK no. 2; US top 50), all in 1966, and "Love Is All Around" (UK no. 5; US no. 7) in 1967 (1968 in the US). 

The Troggs also had several smaller hits, including "Any Way That You Want Me", a UK no. 8 in January 1967, and "Night of the Long Grass" and "Give It to Me", both UK top 20 hits during 1967. Bond left the Troggs in 1988.

Death 
Bond died on 13 November 1992 in the Royal Hampshire County Hospital, Winchester, Hampshire, aged 52.

Discography

References

1940 births
1992 deaths
English rock drummers
People from Andover, Hampshire
Musicians from Hampshire
The Troggs members
20th-century English singers